The Journal of Experiments in Fluid Mechanics is a bimonthly peer-reviewed scientific journal covering fluid dynamics. It was established  in 1987 and is published by the China Aerodynamics Research Society. The editor-in-chief is Jialing Le. The journal publishes articles in Chinese and English.

External links 
 
 

Fluid dynamics journals
Multilingual journals
Bimonthly journals
Academic journals published by learned and professional societies
Publications established in 1987